Edmund Seger (16 February 1937 – 26 May 2019) was a German wrestler. He competed in the men's Greco-Roman lightweight at the 1960 Summer Olympics.

References

1937 births
2019 deaths
German male sport wrestlers
Olympic wrestlers of the United Team of Germany
Wrestlers at the 1960 Summer Olympics
Sportspeople from Freiburg im Breisgau